Reg Macey (born 9 December 1936) is a former Australian politician.

Macey was born in Melbourne to Reginald George Gordon and Nelly Gwendoline Macey, and trained as a teacher. He taught in Technical Schools from 1957 until 1968. While on a teaching scholarship, he taught part-time at a Primary School in 1969 and again in 1972. In his other teaching years he was seconded to the Victoria Police, and was an Education Officer there for a total of 12 years. On 18 May 1963 he married Patricia Anne Martin, with whom he had three children; Leah, Martina, and Keiran. Their marriage was dissolved in 1987, and on 29 October 1988 Macey married Maureen Griffiths, with whom he had a son, Griffith Macey. They separated in 2004. Macey was commissioner of the Melbourne and Metropolitan Board of Works from 1974 to 1978 and area commissioner from 1978 to 1981 and 1984 to 1985. He was a South Melbourne City Councillor from 1973 to 1981 and from 1982 to 1985, serving as mayor from 1977 to 1978 and 1978 to 1979. In 1985 he was elected to the Victorian Legislative Council as a Liberal, representing Monash Province. He held his seat until 1992, when he resigned.

He resigned from supporting the Liberal Party in 2004 when, as he described it, '.. the Liberals abandoned Sir Robert Menzies' dream of “an Australian nation … in which every family is enabled to live in, and preferably to own, a comfortable home at reasonable cost and with adequate community amenities,” as articulated in his 1945 Liberal Party constitution. ' (5) He described his critical turning point was when the Treasurer in the then LNP Federal Government, Peter Costello, ignored a Productivity Commission recommendation from an Enquiry which he had commissioned...

"The Australian Government should, as soon as practicable, establish a review of those aspects of the personal income tax regime that may have recently

contributed to excessive investment in rental housing. The focus of the review should be on the Capital Gains Tax provisions. ". Treasurer Costello ignored that recommendation. Macey claims that, consequently Australian housing unaffordability careered out of control.

Subsequently, in 2013, he founded the Australian Affordable Housing Party which was registered for federal elections in 2017, with Macey as its President. Macey founded the party before the 2013 election along with a group of mature voters who were concerned about their adult children's ability to become first home owners (4) The party announced on Facebook that Macey had been replaced as party President by its Bennelong byelection candidate Anthony Ziebell in February 2018.   
Macey explained this development as follows...

References

1936 births
Living people
Liberal Party of Australia members of the Parliament of Victoria
Members of the Victorian Legislative Council
Politicians from Melbourne

4 https://www.macrobusiness.com.au/2016/12/join-affordable-housing-australia-party-free/

5 https://www.northerndailyleader.com.au/story/5068426/meet-the-candidate-andrew-potts/